The discography of the Serbian rock band Idoli (Serbian Cyrillic: Идоли; trans. The Idols), consists of two studio albums, one EP, five singles and two compilation albums.

The band released their first recordings on the double A-side single "Pomoć, pomoć" / "Retko te viđam sa devojkama", released with the May 1980 copy of the Vidici magazine. A newly recorded version of "Retko te viđam sa devojkama" appeared as a B-side of the band second single "Maljčiki", released in 1981. During the same year, with the new drummer Kokan Popović, the band released the highly successful EP VIS Idoli. In the meantime, the band appeared on the Paket aranžman compilation, with Električni Orgazam and Šarlo Akrobata. The release is considered one of the greatest releases of Yugoslav pop and rock music, being second behind the Idoli debut album Odbrana i poslednji dani, recorded in the late 1981 and released in early 1982, as voted by the Džuboks magazine in 1985. The album, one of the first Yugoslav rock concept albums, despite making split opinions by the critics, did not repeat the commercial success of the previous releases. The second studio album, Čokolada, recorded in London with the new bassist Branko Isaković, featuring the single "Bambina", became the band's greatest commercial success, sold in circa 350,000 copies, being one of the highest selling albums in SFR Yugoslavia. During the album promotional tour, due to a quarrel between the band members, Idoli split up. The last release under the Idoli band name was Šest dana juna, a soundtrack for the movie of the same name, on which appeared numerous musicians. The single from the release, "Ona to zna", became a nationwide hit. After the album release, the band members pursued solo careers.

In 1990, both Paket aranžman and Odbrana i poslednji dani were rereleased on CD, being one of the first albums released in the format in former Yugoslavia. In 2007, Croatia Records, rereleased Paket aranžman and all Idoli releases except for the Vidici single on the VIS Idoli box set.

Studio albums

Compilation albums

EPs

Singles

Music videos

External links
 EX YU ROCK enciklopedija 1960-2006, Janjatović Petar; 

Discographies of Serbian artists
Rock music group discographies